Vicente Martín Rodríguez (born January 22, 1985) is an Argentine professional boxer.

Professional career
He stepped it up a level in 2008 and was soundly beaten by Australian William Kickett by a lopsided 10 round unanimous decision loss.

He faced unbeaten junior lightweight contender Adrien Broner, as part of an HBO tripleheader to be headlined by Saul Alvarez vs. Kermit Cintron on Nov. 26. He lost by knockout of the third round.

Professional boxing record

References

External links

1985 births
Living people
Argentine male boxers
Super-featherweight boxers